Adidas AG is a German multinational corporation, founded and headquartered in Herzogenaurach, Bavaria, that designs and manufactures shoes, clothing and accessories. It is the largest sportswear manufacturer in Europe, and the second largest in the world, after Nike. It is the holding company for the Adidas Group, which consists 8.33% stake of the football club Bayern München, and Runtastic, an Austrian fitness technology company. Adidas's revenue for 2018 was listed at €21.915 billion.

The company was started by Adolf Dassler in his mother's house; he was joined by his elder brother Rudolf in 1924 under the name Gebrüder Dassler Schuhfabrik ("Dassler Brothers Shoe Factory"). Dassler assisted in the development of spiked running shoes (spikes) for multiple athletic events. To enhance the quality of spiked athletic footwear, he transitioned from a previous model of heavy metal spikes to utilising canvas and rubber. Dassler persuaded U.S. sprinter Jesse Owens to use his handmade spikes at the 1936 Summer Olympics. In 1949, following a breakdown in the relationship between the brothers, Adolf created Adidas and Rudolf established Puma, which became Adidas's business rival.

The three stripes are Adidas's identity mark, having been used on the company's clothing and shoe designs as a marketing aid. The branding, which Adidas bought in 1952 from Finnish sports company Karhu Sports for the equivalent of €1,600 and two bottles of whiskey, became so successful that Dassler described Adidas as "The three stripes company".

History

Early years: the "Gebrüder Dassler Schuhfabrik" 
The company was founded by Adolf "Adi" Dassler who made sports shoes in his mother's scullery or laundry room in Herzogenaurach, Germany after his return from World War I. In July 1924, his older brother Rudolf joined the business, which became "Dassler Brothers Shoe Factory". The electricity supply in Herzogenaurach was unreliable, so the brothers sometimes had to use pedal power from a stationary bicycle to run their equipment.

Dassler assisted in the development of spiked running shoes (spikes) for multiple athletic events. To enhance the quality of spiked athletic footwear, he transitioned from a previous model of heavy metal spikes to utilising canvas and rubber. In 1936, Dassler persuaded U.S. sprinter Jesse Owens to use his hand made spikes at the 1936 Summer Olympics. Following Owens' four gold medals, the name and reputation of Dassler shoes became known to the world's sportsmen and their trainers. Business was successful and the Dasslers were selling 200,000 pairs of shoes every year before World War II.

Both Dassler brothers joined the Nazi Party (NSDAP) in May 1933 and also became members of the National Socialist Motor Corps. Furthermore, Adolf took the rank of Sportwart in the Hitler Youth from 1935 until the end of the war. During the war, the company was running the last sport shoe factory in the country and predominantly supplied the Wehrmacht with shoes. In 1943 the shoe production was forced to cease operations and the company's facilities and workforce was used to manufacture anti-tank weapons. From 1942 to 1945 at least nine forced labourers were working at both sites of the company.

The Dassler factory, used for production of anti-tank weapons during World War II, was nearly destroyed in 1945 by US forces, but was spared when Adolf Dassler's wife convinced the American soldiers that the company and its employees were only interested in manufacturing sports shoes. American occupying forces subsequently became major buyers of the Dassler brothers' shoes.

Split and rivalry with Puma
The brothers split up in 1947 after relations between them had broken down, with Adolf forming a company formally registered as Adidas AG, from Adi Dassler, on 18 August 1949, and Rudolf forming a new firm that he called Ruda – from Rudolf Dassler, later rebranded Puma. An urban myth has promulgated the backronym All Day I Dream About Sports.

Adidas and Puma SE entered into a fierce and bitter business rivalry after the split. Indeed, the town of Herzogenaurach was divided on the issue, leading to the nickname "the town of bent necks"—people looked down to see which shoes strangers wore. Even the town's two football clubs were divided: ASV Herzogenaurach club was supported by Adidas, while 1 FC Herzogenaurach endorsed Rudolf's footwear. When handymen were called to Rudolf's home, they would deliberately wear Adidas shoes. Rudolf would tell them to go to the basement and pick out a pair of free Pumas. The two brothers never reconciled and although they are now buried in the same cemetery, they are spaced as far apart as possible.

In 1948, the first football match after World War II, several members of the West German national football team wore Puma boots, including the scorer of West Germany's first post-war goal, Herbert Burdenski. Four years later, at the 1952 Summer Olympics, 1500 metres runner Josy Barthel of Luxembourg won Puma's first Olympic gold in Helsinki, Finland.

At the 1960 Summer Olympics, Puma paid German sprinter Armin Hary to wear Pumas in the 100 meter sprint final. Hary had worn Adidas before and asked Adolf for payment, but Adidas rejected this request. The German won gold in Pumas, but then laced up Adidas for the medals ceremony, to the shock of the two Dassler brothers. Hary hoped to cash in from both, but Adi was so enraged he banned the Olympic champion.

Corporate image

In 1952, following the 1952 Summer Olympics, Adidas acquired its signature 3-stripe logo from the Finnish athletic footwear brand Karhu Sports, for two bottles of whiskey and the equivalent of €1600.

The Trefoil logo was designed in 1971 and launched in 1972, just in time for the 1972 Summer Olympics held in Munich. This logo lasted until 1997, when the company introduced the "three bars" logo (that had been designed by then Creative Director Peter Moore), initially used on the Equipment range of products.

Tapie affair

After a period of trouble following the death of Adolf Dassler's son Horst Dassler in 1987, the company was bought in 1990 by French industrialist Bernard Tapie, for ₣1.6 billion (now €243.9 million), which Tapie borrowed. Tapie was at the time a famous specialist of rescuing bankrupt companies, an expertise on which he built his fortune.

Tapie decided to move production offshore to Asia. He also hired Madonna for promotion. He sent, from Christchurch, New Zealand, a shoe sales representative to Germany and met Adolf Dassler's descendants (Amelia Randall Dassler and Bella Beck Dassler) and was sent back with a few items to promote the company there.

In 1992, unable to pay the loan interest, Tapie mandated the Crédit Lyonnais bank to sell Adidas, and the bank subsequently converted the outstanding debt owed into equity of the enterprise, which was unusual as per the prevalent French banking practice. The state-owned bank had tried to get Tapie out of dire financial straits as a personal favour to Tapie, it is reported, because Tapie was Minister of Urban Affairs (ministre de la Ville) in the French government at the time.

Robert Louis-Dreyfus, a friend of Tapie, became the new CEO of the company in 1994. He was also the president of Olympique de Marseille, a team Tapie had owned until 1993. Tapie filed for personal bankruptcy in 1994. He was the object of several lawsuits, notably related to match fixing at the football club. During 1997, he served 6 months of an 18-month prison sentence in La Santé prison in Paris. In February 2000, Crédit Lyonnais sold Adidas to Louis-Dreyfus for a much higher amount of money than Tapie owed, 4.485 billion (€683.514 million) francs rather than 2.85 billion (€434.479 million). They also purposely bankrupted Tapie's company that owned Adidas, because only the company had the right to sue them.

Post-Tapie era

In 1994, combined with FIFA Youth Group, SOS Children's Villages became the main beneficiary.

In 1997, Adidas AG acquired the Salomon Group who specialized in ski wear, and its official corporate name was changed to Adidas-Salomon AG. With this acquisition Adidas also acquired the TaylorMade golf company and Maxfli, which allowed them to compete with Nike Golf.

In 1998, Adidas sued the NCAA over their rules limiting the size and number of commercial logos on team uniforms and team clothing. Adidas withdrew the suit, and the two groups established guidelines as to what three-stripe designs would be considered uses of the Adidas trademark.

As CEO of Adidas, Louis-Dreyfus quadrupled revenue to €5.84 billion ($7.5 billion) from 1993 through 2000. In 2000, he announced he would resign the following year, due to illness.

In 2003, Adidas filed a lawsuit in a British court challenging Fitness World Trading's use of a two-stripe motif similar to Adidas's three stripes. The court ruled that despite the simplicity of the mark, Fitness Worlds use was infringing because the public could establish a link between that use and Adidas's mark.

In September 2004, top English fashion designer Stella McCartney launched a joint-venture line with Adidas, establishing a long-term partnership with the corporation. This line is a sports performance collection for women called "Adidas by Stella McCartney", and it has been critically acclaimed.

Also, on 3 May 2005, Adidas told the public that they sold their partner company Salomon Group for €485 million to Amer Sports of Finland.

In August 2005, Adidas declared its intention to buy Reebok for $3.8 billion (US$). This takeover was completed with partnership in January 2006 and meant that the company had business sales closer to those of Nike in North America. The acquisition of Reebok also allowed Adidas to compete with Nike worldwide as the number two athletic shoemaker in the world.

In 2005, Adidas introduced the Adidas 1, the first ever production shoe to use a microprocessor. Dubbed by the company "The World's First Intelligent Shoe", it features a microprocessor capable of performing 5 million calculations per second that automatically adjusts the shoe's level of cushioning to suit its environment. The shoe requires a small, user-replaceable battery that lasts for approximately 100 hours of running. On 25 November 2005, Adidas released a new version of the Adidas 1 with an increased range of cushioning, allowing the shoe to become softer or firmer, and a new motor with 153 percent more torque.

On 11 April 2006, Adidas announced an 11-year deal to become the official NBA clothing provider. The company has been making NBA, NBDL, and WNBA jerseys and products as well as team-coloured versions of the "Superstar" basketball shoe. This deal (worth over $400 million) took over the previous Reebok deal that had been put in place in 2001 for 10 years.

In November 2011, Adidas announced that it would acquire outdoor action sport performance brand Five Ten through a share purchase agreement. The total purchase price was US$25 million in cash at closing.

Recent years 

By the end of 2012, Adidas was reporting their highest revenues ever and Chief Executive Herbert Hainer expressed optimism for the year ahead. Adidas now has global corporate headquarters in Herzogenaurach, Germany and many other business locations around the world such as London, Portland, Toronto, Tokyo, Australia, Taiwan and Spain.

In January 2015, Adidas launched the footwear industry's first reservation mobile app. The Adidas Confirmed app allows consumers to get access to and reserve the brand's limited edition sneakers by using geo targeting technology.

On 24 March 2015, Adidas and McDonald's unveiled the 2015 McDonald's All-American uniforms. For the third year in a row, players will be wearing short-sleeved jerseys, made with the same lightweight and breathable material as the ones used in the NBA.

In August 2015, Adidas acquired fitness technology firm Runtastic for approximately $240 million.

In May 2017, Adidas sold TaylorMade golf company (including Ashworth) to KPS Capital Partners for $425 million.

In March 2022, Adidas sold Reebok to the Authentic Brands Group, for ca. $2.5 billion.

Products

Apparel
Adidas manufactures a range of clothing items, varying from men's and women's t-shirts, jackets, hoodies, pants and leggings.

The first Adidas item of apparel was the Franz Beckenbauer tracksuit created in 1967. Adidas AG is the largest manufacturer of sports bras in Europe, and the second largest manufacturer in the world.

Sportswear

Association football

One of the main focuses of Adidas has always been football kits, and the associated equipment. Adidas remains a major company in the global supply of team kits for international association football teams and clubs.

Adidas makes referee kits that are used in international competition and by many countries and leagues in the world. The company has been an innovator in the area of footwear for the sport, with notable examples including the 1979 release of the Copa Mundial moulded boot used for matches on firm dry pitches. It holds the accolade of the best selling boot of all time. The soft-ground equivalent was named World Cup and it too remains on the market.

Since 1970, FIFA, the world governing body of football, has commissioned specially designed footballs for use in its own World Cup tournaments. The Adidas Telstar was the first ball commissioned for the World Cup in 1970. The balls supplied for the 2006 World Cup, the "Teamgeist", were particularly noteworthy for their ability to travel further than previous types when struck, leading to longer range goals. Goalkeepers were generally believed to be less comfortable with the design of the ball, claiming it was prone to move significantly and unpredictably in flight.

Adidas introduced the Jabulani for the 2010 World Cup. The ball was designed and developed by Loughborough University in conjunction with Bayern München. The Adidas Brazuca for the 2014 World Cup was the first World Cup ball named by the fans. In 2022, for the 14th time in a row, Adidas created the 2022 World Cup ball, Al Rihla.

Adidas is one of the official sponsors of the UEFA Champions League, and the Adidas Finale is the competition's official match ball. Along with the aforementioned Adidas Predator boot, Adidas manufactures the adiPure range of football boots. Adidas named an official match ball of the UEFA Euro 2016 tournament the Adidas Beau Jeu which translates to "The Beautiful Game" in English. Adidas provides clothing and equipment for all teams in Major League Soccer.

Baseball
Adidas has also provided baseball equipment and sponsors numerous players of Major League Baseball and Nippon Professional Baseball in Japan.

Adidas Baseball hardgoods are licensed to Dick's Sporting Goods.

From 1997 to 2008, Adidas sponsored the New York Yankees.

Basketball
Adidas's Superstar and Pro Model shoes, affectionately known as "shelltoes" for their stylized hard rubber toe box, were fueled by, among others, coaches such as UCLA's John Wooden. Adidas drew about even with Converse in basketball by the mid-1970s before both started to fall behind then-upstart Nike in the early 1980s. Subsequently, Adidas Superstar became very popular in the 1980s hip hop streetwear scene alongside Adidas's stripe-sided polyester suits.

From 2006 to 2017, Adidas was the uniform supplier of all the 30 teams in the National Basketball Association, replacing the Reebok brand after Adidas's acquisition of Reebok. Adidas was replaced by Nike as the official uniform supplier of the league after the 2016–17 season.

Cricket

Adidas began manufacturing cricket footwear in the mid-1970s, with their initial target market being Australia. Their shoes were a radical departure from traditional leather cricket boots which had remained basically unchanged for decades, being lighter and more flexible but also offering less toe protection, so that it became not uncommon to see batsmen who had been struck by the ball on the foot hopping around in pain. Having continued to manufacture cricket footwear for many years, in 2006 the company finally entered the field of bat manufacture in 2008 and currently their bat range includes the Pellara, Incurza, Libro and M-Blaster models.

In the 1990s, Adidas signed the superstar Indian batsman Sachin Tendulkar and made shoes for him. From 2008 until his retirement, Adidas had sponsored the cricket bat used by Tendulkar. It created a new bat, 'Adidas MasterBlaster Elite', personalized for him.

In 2008, Adidas made a concerted move into English cricket market by sponsoring English batting star Kevin Pietersen after the cancellation of his lifetime deal with Woodworm, when they ran into financial difficulties. The following year they signed up fellow England player Ian Bell, Pakistan opening batsman Salman Butt and Indian Player Ravindra Jadeja.

In the Indian Premier League (IPL), Adidas sponsored the team Mumbai Indians from 2008 to 2014 and Delhi Daredevils from 2008 to 2013. They were the official sponsors of Pune Warriors India in 2011 and 2012, however the team was banned from IPL due to payment issues. In 2015 Season, Adidas sponsored Royal Challengers Bangalore.

Golf
Adidas Golf manufactures golf clothing, footwear, and accessories. Men's and women's equipment includes footwear, shirts, shorts, pants, outerwear (wind suits), base layer and eyewear.

Gymnastics
From 2000 to 2012, Adidas has provided men's and women's gymnastics wear for Team USA, through USA Gymnastics. USA Gymnastics and Adidas sponsorship concluded at the end of 2012. In 2006, Adidas gymnastics leotards for women and Adidas men's competition shirts, gymnastics pants and gymnastics shorts have been available in the United States, with seasonal leotards offered for Spring, Summer, Fall and Holidays. Adidas previous collaborated with GK Elite, since Spring 2013, Adidas gymnastics products have been available worldwide through Elegant Sports. USA Olympic team members McKayla Maroney, Jordyn Wieber, Jake Dalton and Danell Leyva are all sponsored by Adidas gymnastics.

Ice hockey
Adidas has been providing uniforms for the National Hockey League since the 2017–18 season, replacing Reebok. Adidas will no longer provide on-ice jerseys for the NHL following the 2023-24 season.

Lacrosse
In 2007, Adidas announced its entering to the lacrosse equipment, also sponsoring the Adidas National Lacrosse Classic in July 2008 for the top 600 high school underclassmen players in the United States. The company made their self into their own brand such as "Adidas Lacrosse", getting several scholarships, Bucknell (men and women), Bryant (men), Delaware (men and women), New Jersey Institute of Technology (men), and D3 powerhouse Lynchburg (men and women in fall of 2016 with soft good only)". Materials that Adidas provided were jerseys, shorts, shoes, shafts, heads, gloves, and protective pieces.

Products manufactured for the sport are sticks, gloves, protective gear and boots.

Running

Adidas currently manufactures several running and lifestyle shoes, including the Energy-boost, and the spring-blade trainers. The brand has built a strong runners' network within big European capitals, such as Paris' "Boost Energy League". In 2016 the 3rd season launched. In Paris, the Boost Energy League gathers 11 teams representing different districts of Paris.

Adidas launched two new color ways of the NMD R1 and one new color way of the NMD XR1 in September 2016.

In November 2016, Adidas teased a sneaker made from ocean plastic. The shoe is created from a fabric called "Biosteel". The shoe is called the "Adidas Futurecraft Biofabric." The material used is 15% lighter than conventional silk fibers, and is 100% biodegradable. The shoe only begin to dissolve when it is put in contact with a high concentration of the digestion enzyme proteinase, which occurs naturally. Once this happens, the shoes can decompose within 36 hours. The shoe was never released.

Adidas EQT is a style of sneakers from Adidas. It originated in the early 90s and was relaunched in 2017. The latest Adidas EQT line released in a "Turbo Red" Pack on 26 January 2017, and included models such as the Adidas EQT Support 93/17, EQT Support ADV, and EQT Support Ultra. Adidas.com is one of the few online retailers.

Skateboarding
Adidas Skateboarding produces shoes made specifically for skateboarding, including the redesign of previous models for skateboarding. The brand also releases signature models designed by team riders.

Tennis
Adidas has been involved with tennis equipment since the mid-1960s and has historically sponsored many top tennis players, beginning with two of the most dominant male tennis players at the start of the professional era in the late 1960s, Stan Smith and Ilie Nastase. During the 1980s and 1990s, not only were they exclusive apparel and footwear sponsors of world number one men's tennis players Ivan Lendl and Stefan Edberg and ladies' world number one Steffi Graf, but each player had their own, exclusive graphic styles designed for their use during play, which were in turn marketed to the general public. Ivan Lendl even spent the vast majority of his dominant career playing with several different models of Adidas tennis racquets, primarily using the legendary Adidas GTX-Pro and then later the Adidas GTX Pro-T. In 2009 the company introduced a new line of tennis racquets. While the Feather was made for the "regular player", and the Response for the "club player", Adidas targeted the "tournament player" with the 12.2 oz Barricade tour model.

Kabaddi
Adidas entered Kabaddi which is still a non-Olympic sport but highly popular in the Indian subcontinent and Asian countries. In 2014, with the launch of Pro Kabaddi League a city based franchise league in India, Kabaddi took the region by storm. In 2015, they tied up with Mumbai-based franchise U Mumba.

Accessories

Adidas also designs and makes slide-style sandals, mobile accessories, watches, eyewear, bags, baseball caps, and socks. As well, Adidas has a branded range of male and female deodorants, perfumes, aftershave and lotions.

Adidas announced they would be launching a new $199 Fit Smart wristband in mid-August 2014. The wristband will pair with Adidas's miCoach app, which acts as a personal trainer.

Adilette

Adilette was the first ever pair of sandals made by Adidas, originally developed in 1963. Adidas claims that a group of athletes approached Adi Dassler requesting a shoe be made for the locker room. To this day, the resulting sandals are a best-seller. Since the original navy blue and white Adilette sandals were created nearly fifty years ago, more varieties have been created in different colours (black, red, green, grey, orange, brown, yellow, pink, golden, silver). Most recently, Adidas has introduced a colour scheme that goes along with its Predator and adizero line; the scheme is dubbed warning (orange) and purple. Usually, the three stripes appear in the contrasting colour on the strap of the classic models. The most common Adilette livery is in navy blue or black, mixed with white colours. Also the Woodilette and Trefoil models follow a similar design but without stripes on the strap.

The model provides a contoured orthopedic rubber sole with synthetic upper, and was designed as an after sport slide sandal, but the Adilette were quickly adopted outside of the sporting world.

Adissage

Adissage is also a slide sandal. Available in black, navy, light blue, black with pink, and other assorted colors, the sandal has the trademarked three stripes on a velcro strap toward the front of the shoe. On the side of the shoe, toward the heel on either side, the manufacturers name appears, as well as on a round emblem in the actual heel of the footbed. Notably, there are tiny black massage nubs throughout the foot-bed for the purpose of massaging foot aches after sport, although popular as a casual sandal amongst non-athletes as well.

Santiossage
The Santiossage is a slide-style sandal. The sandal has the trademarked three stripes on a velcro strap toward the front of the shoe. Santiossage comes in black, navy, or red. On the side of the shoe, toward the heel on either side, the manufacturer's name appears, as well as on a round emblem in the actual heel of the foot-bed. Like the Adissage there are tiny clear massage nubs throughout the foot-bed for the purpose of massaging after-sport footaches, although the sandals are worn casually among non-athletes. Seen through these clear nubs are Adidas's three stripes.

Marketing

During the mid to late 1990s, Adidas divided the brand into three main groups with each a separate focus: Adidas Performance was designed to maintain their devotion to the athlete; Adidas Originals was designed to focus on the brand's earlier designs which remained a popular life-style icon; and Style Essentials, which dealt with the fashion market; the main group within this being Y-3 (which is a collaboration between Adidas and renowned Japanese fashion designer Yohji Yamamoto - the Y representing Yamamoto and the 3 representing the three stripes of Adidas).

Launched in 2004, "Impossible is Nothing" is one of the company's most memorable campaigns. The campaign was developed by 180/TBWA based in Amsterdam, but significant work was also done by TBWA\Chiat\Day in San Francisco. A few years later, Adidas launched a basketball specific campaign -- "Believe in 5ive"—for the 2006-2007 NBA season.

In 2011, "Adidas is all in" became the global marketing strategy slogan for Adidas. The slogan aimed to tie all brands and labels together, presenting a unified image to consumers interested in sports, fashion, street, music and pop culture. There appears to be connection with the phrase "all-in" meaning "exhausted" in some English speaking nations.

In 2015, Adidas launched "Creating the New" as its strategic business plan until 2020.

Collaborations
Adidas has done several collaborations with well known designers, including Alexander Wang, Jeremy Scott, Raf Simons, and Stella McCartney. They have also reached out to several celebrities, such as Beyoncé, Jonah Hill, Karlie Kloss, Ninja and Pharrell Williams to create some of the company's most notable and coveted pieces.

Game advertisement
The brand is featured in several games, including Daley Thompson's Olympic Challenge (Commodore Amiga), Adidas power soccer (Sony PlayStation) and Adidas Championship Football (Commodore 64, ZX spectrum, Amstrad CPC).

Marketing in India 
India has been a very speculative market for Adidas. Despite this Dave Thomas, managing director of Adidas in India is ambitious for the country's potential. The company hoped to double its revenue from Rs. 805 crores by 2020. In 2015, the company signed Ranveer Singh a prominent Bollywood actor as a brand ambassador to the company's products. Ranveer then was a budding actor. The company later decided to use the people's almost religious adoration for the game of cricket to promote their brand. It soon launched a new cricket campaign in the country. The campaign was called FeelLoveUseHate with prominent Indian cricketer Virat Kohli. However, in 2017, Virat Kohli was removed as the brand ambassador of the company. The cricketer later signed a major deal with Puma India. The company also sells its products online through e-commerce websites such as Myntra, Snapdeal, Jabong and Amazon. Adidas also has a website dedicated to the Indian audience that markets and sells products to its consumers in India.

Sponsorship

Adidas has numerous major kit deals with football clubs worldwide, including their main sponsor Bayern München. Moreover, their sponsored national teams include Germany, Spain, Mexico, Argentina, Sweden, Japan, Hungary, Belgium, Colombia, Wales and Italy.

Adidas has sponsored numerous players, including Lionel Messi, Zinedine Zidane, Kaká, David Beckham, Steven Gerrard, Gareth Bale, Thomas Müller, Xavi, Mesut Özil, James Rodríguez, Iker Casillas, Arjen Robben, Paul Pogba, Dele Alli, Luis Suárez, Ivan Rakitić, Diego Costa, Mohamed Salah, Roberto Firmino, Paulo Dybala, Mats Hummels and Manuel Neuer.

Adidas is one of the official sponsors of the UEFA Champions League, and the Adidas Finale is the competition's official match ball. Along with the Adidas Predator boot, Adidas manufactures the adiPure range of football boots. Adidas provides clothing and equipment for all teams in Major League Soccer (MLS).

In July 2014, Adidas and Manchester United agreed to a ten-year kit deal, beginning with the 2015–16 Premier League season. This kit deal has a guaranteed minimum value of £750 million (US$1.29 billion), making it the most valuable kit deal in sports history, and replaced rival Nike as the club's global equipment partner.

In November 2009, World Number 4 tennis player Andy Murray was confirmed as Adidas's highest-paid star with a five-year contract reportedly worth US$24.5 million. In Cincinnati, at the ATP Tennis Tournament in Mason, they have also sponsored the ball-boy and ball-girl uniforms. Adidas is also partners with Malibu Tennis Camp, Green Fitness GmbH and with Schöler & Micke Sportartikel Vertriebs GmbH.

Adidas has sponsored numerous basketball players like Kareem Abdul-Jabbar, Chauncey Billups, Tim Duncan, Brandon Knight, Jeremy Lin, Tracy McGrady, Iman Shumpert and present players like James Harden, Damian Lillard, Donovan Mitchell, Candace Parker, Derrick Rose, John Wall and Trae Young. Adidas also endorsed Kobe Bryant with the Adidas Equipment KB8 as his first signature shoe until July 2002. The company also endorsed Kevin Garnett until he opted out of his contract in 2010. Gilbert Arenas was an Adidas endorser until 2010. In August 2015, James Harden left Nike for Adidas by signing a 13-year contract reportedly worth US$200 million.

In rugby union, Adidas is the current kit supplier to the All Blacks, the France national team, the Italian national rugby team and the South African Stormers and Western Province rugby union teams among others. Adidas is also the New Zealand Rugby Union clothing sponsor and supplies clothing to all Super Rugby franchises, a selection of domestic teams and national referees. Adidas are also the official match ball supplier to the Heineken Cup. Adidas was the British and Irish Lions kit supplier from 1997 to 2013. They are the jersey manufacturers of the Gold Coast Titans Rugby League club in the Australasian National Rugby League. Dual rugby and league international and former boxer Sonny Bill Williams is a global ambassador for Adidas.

Adidas has provided field hockey equipment and sponsors numerous players of Germany, England, Netherlands, Australia, Spain and Belgium. The company has been the kit provider of Argentine women's and men's teams for over 15 years. The company also sponsored clubs Reading, Beeston and East Grinstead.

Adidas also sponsors pro golfers including Daniel Berger, Sergio García, Dustin Johnson, Danielle Kang, Collin Morikawa, Joaquín Niemann and Xander Schauffele. Since Adidas does not make golf equipment the sponsorship is more limited to clothing and shoes.

In ice hockey, Adidas signed an agreement with National Hockey League (NHL) to be the official outfitter of uniforms and licensed apparel, starting in the 2017–18 season.

Adidas's cricket sponsorships include cricketers Lasith Malinga, Kieron Pollard, Dwayne Bravo and K. L. Rahul. Adidas's volleyball sponsorships include Ivan Zaytsev and Earvin N'Gapeth, who advertises as a model and brand ambassador for Adidas.

IP protection 
In 2016, Adidas filed lawsuits against Skechers for making a duplicate Stan Smith design and for Adidas replicas such as "Springblade".

Corporate information

Current executive board
 CEO: Kasper Rørsted
 Chief Financial Officer: Harm Ohlmeyer
 Global Brands: Eric Liedtke
 Global Operations: Gil Steyeart
 Global Sales: Roland Auschel

Former management
 CEO (1993–2002): Robert Louis-Dreyfus
 CEO (2002–2016): Herbert Hainer

Financial information

Criticism
Adidas's business practises/ethics and commitment to worker welfare have been scrutinised and often criticised.

2011 All Blacks replica rugby jersey pricing controversy

Unhappy with the local price of the Adidas replica All Blacks jersey, New Zealand-based All Blacks fans have asked for price cuts and begun purchasing the jersey from overseas vendors after it was revealed that the local price of NZ$220 was more than twice the price offered on some websites.

Adidas has responded by enforcing cross-border agreements to stop overseas retailers from selling to New Zealand residents. It has been labelled a public relations disaster by leading New Zealand PR firms and Consumer advocate groups. The largest New Zealand sportswear retailer Rebel Sport has stated it is angry and is considering selling the All Blacks Jerseys to the general public below cost.

2012 "shackle" sneakers
On 14 June 2012, Adidas posted on their Facebook page a picture of a pair of Jeremy Scott-designed shoes containing shackles. The picture was of a planned shoe line that Adidas intended to release in July. The photo quickly caused controversy including that of Jesse Jackson who was quoted as saying "The attempt to commercialize and make popular more than 200 years of human degradation, where blacks were considered three-fifths human by our Constitution is offensive, appalling and insensitive". Jackson threatened a boycott, and NBA commissioner David Stern was at one point reportedly contacted in hopes that he would intervene. Shortly after the outcry, the company cancelled the product.

Sweatshops and labour rights violations
Adidas has been criticized for operating sweatshops, particularly in Indonesia. Between 2006 and 2007, Adidas rejected many of its suppliers that supported unions in favour of subcontractors with worse labour rights records. By subcontracting work to different suppliers, it is more difficult for Adidas to ensure company labour standards are enforced. Adidas's policy includes the freedom for workers to take part in collective bargaining and a non-retaliation policy towards workers who express concerns. In practice, however, many of Adidas's suppliers have not upheld these standards. At the Panarub factory in Java, 33 workers were fired after striking for better pay in 2005. PT Kizone is another Indonesian factory where Adidas has been criticized over treatment of workers. They produced products for Adidas as well as Nike and the Dallas Cowboys until they closed in January 2011. 2,686 workers who were laid off are owed $3 million in severance pay and benefits. Nike has contributed $1.5 million but Adidas has not acted. A campaign has been initiated by United Students Against Sweatshops calling for universities to cut contracts with Adidas. On 16 July 2012, War on Want organised activists in London to replace Adidas price tags in sports stores with 34p ones, a reference to the low hourly wage rate paid to the Indonesian workers who make Adidas goods. The campaign group Labour Behind the Label claimed that the basic pay of Indonesian Adidas workers was only £10 a week. William Anderson, head of social and environmental affairs for the Asia Pacific region, posted an entry on the company blog in which he claimed that total wages including bonuses and overtime were often double the hourly wage, and drew attention to purchasing power parity.

In April 2014, one of the biggest strikes on mainland China took place at the Yue Yuen Industrial Holdings Dongguan shoe factory, producing amongst others for Adidas.

In 2022, researchers from Nordhausen University of Applied Sciences identified cotton from Xinjiang in Adidas shirts.

Soviet themed items, and advertising
In 2018, Adidas promoted a line of Soviet themed items. After a social media outcry, they were taken off the market.

NCAA corruption scandal
Adidas executive James Gatto was indicted in the 2017 NCAA Division I men's basketball corruption scandal.

Racial diversity controversy
In June 2020, the head of global human resources at Adidas voluntarily stepped down after black employees raised concerns about her failure to address racism and discrimination in the workplace. The former HR chief had also made a comment about racism being "noise," in addition to not adequately addressing workforce diversity. Upon her resignation, she made a statement saying that she supports the company's continued progress towards racial justice and offered an apology.

See also

 Adidas Originals
 List of Adidas sponsorships
 Puma SE, formed by Rudolf Dassler, brother of Adolf Dassler

References

Sources

External links

  (corporate)
  (consumer)

 
 
1970s fashion
1980s fashion
1990s fashion
2000s fashion
2010s fashion
2020s fashion
1989 mergers and acquisitions
1995 initial public offerings
Athletic shoe brands
Clothing brands of Germany
Clothing companies established in 1924
Clothing companies of Germany
Companies based in Bavaria
Companies based in Herzogenaurach
Companies in the Euro Stoxx 50
Companies listed on the Frankfurt Stock Exchange
German companies established in 1924
Multinational companies headquartered in Germany
Premier Lacrosse League partnerships
Shoe brands
Shoe companies of Germany
Skateboard shoe companies
Sporting goods manufacturers of Germany
Sportswear brands
Swimwear manufacturers